Chiranjeevi is an Indian actor and producer who works predominantly in Telugu cinema. He has also appeared in Hindi, Tamil and Kannada films. He made his acting debut in 1978, with the film Punadhirallu. However, Pranam Khareedu was released earlier at the box office. Known for his break dancing skills, Chiranjeevi has starred in more than 150 feature films. He rose to stardom after playing the lead in the action film Khaidi (1983). His 1987 film Swayamkrushi premiered at the Moscow International Film Festival. He co-produced Rudraveena (1988), which won the National Film Award for Best Feature Film on National Integration. In a film career spanning thirty five years, He won four state Nandi Awards and nine Filmfare Awards South.

In 2006, Chiranjeevi was honoured with the Padma Bhushan, India's third highest civilian award, for his contributions to Indian cinema, and was presented with an honorary doctorate from Andhra University. In 2013, he inaugurated the Incredible India Exhibition, a joint participation of the Ministry of Tourism and Ministry of Information and Broadcasting at the 66th Cannes Film Festival. He also represented Incredible India at the 14th International Indian Film Academy Awards ceremony held in Macau. In 2013, IBN LIVE named him as one of "The men who changed the face of the Indian Cinema".

Chiranjeevi's 1992 film Gharana Mogudu, is the first Telugu film to gross over 10 crore at the box office. The film made Chiranjeevi the highest-paid actor in India at the time, catapulting him to the cover pages of noted national weekly magazines in India. The entertainment magazines Filmfare and India Today named him "Bigger than Bachchan", a reference to Bollywood's Amitabh Bachchan. News magazine The Week hailed him as "The new money machine". He was paid a remuneration of 1.25 crores for the 1992 film Aapadbandhavudu, the highest for any Indian actor then. In 2002, Chiranjeevi was given the Samman Award for the Highest Income Tax Payer for the assessment year 1999-2000 by the Minister of State for Finance, Government of India. A poll conducted by CNN-IBN in 2006 named Chiranjeevi the most popular star of the Telugu Film Industry.

In 2022, Chiranjeevi starred in Acharya directed by Koratala Siva co-starring Ram Charan, Sonu Sood and Pooja Hegde. His second film released in 2022 was Godfather, in which Salman Khan and Nayanthara played supporting roles.

Film

As an actor

Telugu

Other languages

Other roles

Television

Notes

References

External links
 

Indian filmographies
Male actor filmographies